In hadith studies, Israiliyyat (in  "Israelisms") are narratives assumed to be of foreign import. Although indicating such stories develop from Jewish sources, narratives designated as Isra'iliyyat might also derive from other religions such as Christianity or Zoroastrianism. Isrā'īlīyāt were received varyingly by both early and later Muslim scholars, with early prophetic traditions criticising their details yet encouraging their transmission. Many pre-modern scholars enthusiastically used them, while many Arab scholars in modern times have called them unislamic.

These narratives appear frequently in Qur'anic commentaries, Sufi narratives and history compilations. They are used to offer more detailed information regarding earlier prophets mentioned in the Bible and the Qur'an, stories about the ancient Israelites, and fables allegedly or actually taken from Jewish sources.

History

Often included under the designation Isra’iliyyat are qisas al-anbiya ("tales of the prophets"). These tales have been divided into the following three categories by Tilman Nagel: first, legends about the creation; second, legends about the prophets; third, stories of the “Israelite people and their rulers from the death of Moses to their entry into the Promised Land”.
 
The term Isra’iliyyat was originally a descriptive term without any larger tags indicating legitimacy or illegitimacy. Marc Bernstein asserts that Isra’iliyyat was encouraged or at least condoned among Muslim scholars through the Umayyad and early Abbasid period. The acceptance of Isra’iliyyat traditions may have been strengthened by a widely known hadith cited by al-Shafi’i stating that Muhammad said, “Narrate [traditions] from the Children of Israel for there is nothing objectionable in that.” Other hadith were however less positive, with Bukhari reporting, "If the People of the Book tell you something do not either accept it as true or reject it as false for they may tell you something which is false but you may accept it is true". Despite the early acceptance of Isra’iliyyat stories and traditions, the term came to have a negative, even pejorative connotation. Toward the end of the eighth century and the period of canonization, “the ulama (religious scholars) began to forbid the transmission of traditions that were considered to be of foreign origin.”  Despite such prohibition many of the stories held wide popular appeal. Because such stories were largely not relevant to Islamic law (al-shari’ah), they were not subjected to focused elimination by authorities, and thus remained ubiquitous in folk culture.

There is no clear evidence regarding the exact manner by which biblical and Talmudic themes entered Islamic literature. Muslim sources indicate a number of individuals who converted to Islam from Judaism among the first generations of Muslims and were transmitters of Isra’iliyyat. These include such names as Ka’b al-Ahbar and Abd Allah b. Salam. Some sources also suggest that “Muslims studied with practicing Jews,” though the nature and extent of such coeducation is not clear. Biblical events and exegetical commentaries of Jewish origin may also have entered Islamic tradition via educated Christians of Eastern churches such as those of Abyssinia and/or through various local populations of Jews in the Yemen and the Arabian Peninsula.

Historically, the Isra'iliyyat were well received by the mufassirun (Quranic exegists) and historians, with at-Tabari being a prominent example. Conversely they were mainly criticised by the Hadith scholars and the theologians such as Al-Nawawi, Al-Dhahabi and Al-Ghazali. There were some exceptions to this - medieval exegete Ibn Kathir was in particular quite critical of Isra'iliyyat, foregoing their use in his Tafsir. Many contemporary scholars have followed suit, purging Isra'iliyyat from Quran commentaries and Islamic traditions.

Ibn Taymiyyah classified the narratives of the Isra'iliyyat into three categories:
 Those considered to be true because the revelation to Muhammad confirms them.
 Those considered to be false because the revelation to Muhammad rejects them.
 Those not known to be either true or false.

Transmitters of Isra’iliyyat 

Among the best known transmitters of Isra’iliyyat traditions is Wahb b. Munabbih (655-732 CE), who lived in the generation after the Sahaba (companions of Muhammad), and who is cited as a trustworthy source for many oral accounts linked to Jewish and Christian traditions. Another well-known transmitter of Isra’iliyyat is Kaʽb al-Akhbār (d. 652 CE), a Yemenite Jew who converted to Islam shortly after the death of Muhammad. He is credited with many oral and written traditions from the Bible and Jewish sources. Yet another is Abdullah ibn Salam, who is described as a rabbi before his conversion to Islam.

Ibn ‘Abbas (619-687 CE), was a cousin and young companion of Muhammad. He is regarded as one of the greatest authorities on the Qur’an in general and especially the place of Isra’iliyyat traditions in its interpretation. Ibn Abbas was only thirteen years old at the time of Muhammad’s death. "Ibn ‘Abbas is reported to have been responsible for the transmission of large amounts of exegetical traditions to later Qur’an commentaries. A broad amount of Isra’iliyyat traditions were attributed to him. Ibn Ishaq (85-150 AH) is known as a historian and was responsible for writing one of the earliest biographies of Muhammad. The first section of his biography, which does not exist anymore but is still cited is an account of the prophets and other figures from Adam leading up to Muhammad. Abu Hayyan Saeed ,Hadith Scholar said that there is no need of Fake Narrations.

Israeliyyat regarding prophets

Adam 

Tabari writes, “God created Adam with his own hands so that God could say to Iblis (Satan) that he was exalting himself over that which God formed with his own hands. So God created Adam as a human and his body was from clay. God breathed his spirit into Adam. Then when God’s spirit entered his eyes he saw the fruits of Paradise and when it entered his stomach he was hungry, so before the spirit reached his feet he tried to get up in haste to have the fruits of Paradise. This is the meaning of God’s word: “Man was created in haste” (21:37) In regards to the testing of Adam and Eve, Ibn Ishaq writes, “Iblis started off by crying for Adam and Eve, and they became sad when they heard him. They asked him why he was crying and he said, “I am crying for you because you will die and be forced to give up the luxury and plenty you are enjoying.” Then Iblis went to them and whispered saying, “Adam, may I lead you to the Tree of Immortality and to a kingdom that does not decline?” (20:120) Meaning that they might become angels or live forever in Paradise. In the Qur'an it states, “When we took from the prophets their covenant from you, Noah, Abraham, and Jesus son of Mary. We took from them a solemn covenant” (Q 33:7) That covenant was, as quoted by Ibn Abbas “The Prophet Muhammad said, “God took a covenant from the back of Adam on the day of ‘Arafat. He caused all of his offspring to come out of him, and spread them out in front of him. In regards to Adam’s death, Tabari writes, “When Adam died it was Friday. The angels came to him, sent by God from Paradise, to embalm and wrap him, and they honored his son and heir Seth. Ibn Ishaq says: The sun and the moon were eclipsed for seven days and nights.

Abraham 
Reuven Firestone states that, “In the case of the Abraham story... Islamic interpretative literature traces his journeys to Haran, the land of Canaan, Egypt and back again to Canaan in a manner that parallels the basic route and chronology of the biblical story found in Genesis.” However, in the Quran, Abraham's journey also leads him to Mecca. Firestone states, “Abraham’s prayer in Quran 14:37 serves as proof text in the exegetical literature for his Meccan experience: “Our Lord! I have made some of my offspring dwell in an uncultivated wadi by your sacred house, in order o Lord, which they may establish, regular prayer. There are other Quranic verses such as: “2:125-127, 3:97, and 22:26” that locate Abraham in Mecca. Firestone continues through his article to discuss how Islamic hadith and Quranic scripture were passed down orally. He also discusses how during this time, Christianity, Judaism, and Islam were all influencing one another in relation to the scriptural stories. Ibn Abbas, as discussed above, also recounts the story of Abraham's journey from Syria to Mecca. This story was told by Ali b. Abi Talib, by Mujahid, and by Ibn Abbas. The version of this story told by Ibn Abbas can be found nineteen times among the sources, “it is the most popular and most complete explanation of Abraham’s transfer from Syria to Mecca”. To summarize the Ibn Abbas’ account, Abraham's wife, Sarah, becomes jealous of Hagar because of the birth of Ishmael. Hagar leaves the house that she is staying in with Abraham and Sarah and hides her track so no one can follow her. Abraham takes Ishmael and Hagar to Mecca. After leaving both of them there, he returns to Syria. Hagar is weary of being left in this place and Abraham then recites the Quran 14:37-38: “O Lord! I have made some of my offspring live in an uncultivated wadi by your sacred house, in order, O Lord, that they establish regular prayer. So fill the hearts of some with love toward them, and feed them with fruits so that they may give thanks. O Lord! You know what we conceal and what we reveal, for nothing on Earth or in Heaven is hidden from God.” Both Ishmael and Hagar run out of water and Hagar can no longer feed Ishmael by nursing him. “She climbs Safa and Marwa and runs between them seven times.” Ibn Abbas notes that either Gabriel, another angel, or Ishmael struck the ground with their heel and caused water to flow out of it. “The angel tells Hagar not to worry about perishing, for the boy and his father will someday build the House of God there in Mecca. This version of the legend follows the biblical account of Genesis 21:19-21 in almost perfect order.” The many versions of this legend attribute the importance and provide explanation for this religious building in Mecca. Reuven Firestone writes that this interpretation of the story, “serves in effect as an Islamic midrash on Genesis 21:10-21, and indeed, contains motifs with clear parallels in post-biblical Jewish exegetical literature.” Many different versions that have been written serve different purposes in the Islamic tradition. Ali's version includes more supernatural events that may be added for the purpose of making the Ka’ba seen as more of an important religious shrine to the Islamic people. Whereas, Ibn Abbas’ version perfectly aligns with the biblical narration in Genesis.

Jesus 
All the prophets prior to Muhammad were important, however the three Prophets mentioned here made a vast difference in Isra’iliyyat traditions. Many sources comment on the relevance that Jesus had as a prophet to the Israelite people. “There are differences between Islamic and Christian thinking about Jesus that are important to note. Islamic beliefs and Christian beliefs both accept the virgin birth, Jesus’ miracles that are remembered by the Muslim people are the revival of the dead and the creation of a bird from clay. They believe however, that all these miracles have only come to be through the permission of Allah. They believe that because he came into this world through divine inspiration and a human mother, that the miracles he performed were also human actions with divine permission."  “With respect to form, the references in the Qur’an can be divided into four groups: birth and infancy stories, miracles, conversations between Jesus and God or between Jesus and the Israelites, and divine pronouncements on his humanity, servanthood, and place in the prophetic line which stipulate that fanatical opinions about him must be abandoned. "His sinless birth- which in the Qur’an takes place under a palm tree- and the words he speaks as an infant in the cradle are all signs, manifestations of divine favor shown to him and his mother." Unlike the canonical Gospels, the Qur'an pays more attention to his miraculous birth rather than to his Passion. 
 
“According to Muhammad b. Sahl b. Askar al-Bukari Ismail b. Abd al-Karim- ‘Abd al-Samad b. Maquil, the son of the brother of Wahb,  Wahb: When God sent Gabriel to Mary he appeared to her as a shapely man. She then said, “I take refuge in the All Merciful from you, if you fear God!” Then he breathed into the opening of her garment, the breath reached her womb, and she conceived Jesus. A relative of hers was with her, Joseph the carpenter by name. Mary and Joseph were then serving at that Temple, and service there was a great honor.

"Qisas al-anbiya, ‘Stories of the Prophets’, is the title of widespread books relating to the lives of pre-Islamic prophets and heroes, and emerging in the eleventh century." These collections were attributed to Abu Ishaq Ahmad ibn Muhammad al-Tha’labi. "The main focus of the Qisas-genre as regards Jesus are as follows: Mary’s pregnancy, the birth of Jesus and the flight to Egypt, the infancy miracles of Jesus, the disciples of Jesus, the virtues of the adult Jesus with emphasis on his miracles, the end of his life and his descent from heaven seven days after he had been raised up, the death of Mary and the king of Rome, and the second descent of Jesus in the last days." Due to having already discussed his birth and his miracles, it would be interesting to discuss Muslim thought on his death. With reference to Wahb, many details from the passion story of the New Testament Gospels are referred to in a somewhat altered fashion. For example, Jesus washes the hands of his disciples as a symbol of humility and sacrifice, the disciples fall asleep, Simon denies him, and Judas betrays him. In this version, the likeness of Jesus is said to be cast upon Judas, and he is sacrificed in place of Jesus. With reference to the qur’anic expression in 3.55, it said that Jesus himself was told to die by Allah for three hours, before he was raised to heaven. "According to other theories for substitution reported in the Qisas, the likeness of Jesus is cast either on the jailer, or on a voluntary friend of Jesus." The crucifixion of Jesus is mentioned only once in the Qur'an and only takes up two verses: one directly (4:157) and the other by inference (4:158). These sources provide relevant information on how Islamic traditions can be better understood through biblical and Quranic narratives.

References

Arabic words and phrases
Hadith studies
Islamic terminology